Heroes were an Australian group from Newcastle, who had an Australian which reached No.6 on the Australian Kent Music Report.

In January 2015, the band released their second studio album So Far, which came with a bonus album of their 1980 debut.

Discography

Albums

Singles

References

Australian musical groups
1980 establishments in Australia